Hnizdychiv is an urban-type settlement in Stryi Raion, Lviv Oblast, Ukraine. Hnizdychiv hosts the administration of Hnizdychiv settlement hromada, one of the hromadas of Ukraine. Population:  

Until 18 July 2020, Hnizdychiv belonged to Zhydachiv Raion. The raion was abolished in July 2020 as part of the administrative reform of Ukraine, which reduced the number of raions of Lviv Oblast to seven. The area of Zhydachiv Raion was merged into Stryi Raion.

Hnizdychiv contains Saint Gerard Catholic Church.

References

Urban-type settlements in Stryi Raion